HMS Albemarle was a 28-gun sixth rate frigate of the Royal Navy. She had been built as the French merchantman Ménagère, which the French Navy purchased in 1779. A British squadron captured her in September and she was commissioned into service with the Royal Navy. Amongst her commanders in her short career was Captain Horatio Nelson, who would later win several famous victories over the French. The Navy sold her in 1784. She subsequently became a merchant vessel again. In 1791 she transported convicts to Port Jackson as part of the third fleet. She then sailed to India where she picked up a cargo on behalf of the British East India Company. As she was returning to England a French privateer captured her.

Career
Ménagère was launched in 1776 as a merchant vessel. The French Navy purchased her at Bordeaux in May 1779.

The French government despatched her from Bordeaux for Cap-François, together with other transport vessels. On 22 and 23 September, a Royal Navy squadron under William Hotham, captured seven members of the convoy off San Domingo. The actual captor may have been , though supporting evidence is scarce.

The prize court at Barbados condemned Ménagère on 17 November. At that point the Royal Navy acquired her, the only one out of the seven vessels that the squadron had captured that it wanted to keep.

Captain John Thomas commissioned Ménagère on 22 November, and brought with him the officers and crew from his previous command, the sloop . An additional 44 men transferred from Hotham's flagship ; Albemarle was duly assigned to serve off the Leeward Islands. Captain Thomas Taylor succeeded Thomas on 12 June 1780. Under Taylor, Albemarle was part of Sir George Rodney's fleet during the Battle of Martinique in April 1780, but did not herself take part in the battle.

Albemarle remained in the Caribbean and was in Carlisle Bay, Barbados, when a hurricane that began on 11 October damaged her. Taylor remained in command while repairs were carried out that allowed her to sail for Britain as a convoy escort. She was paid off in February 1781.

Under Nelson
Albemarle was then fitted and coppered at Woolwich between 3 July and 12 October 1781. The work cost £7,302 4s 1d. While Albemarle was undergoing this fitting, the 22-year-old Captain Horatio Nelson commissioned her on 15 August 1781 for the North Sea and the English Channel.

She is in dock, alongside the Enterprize, and in some I think, excels her. She has a bold entrance and a clean run. 

Nelson's companion and former commanding officer, Captain William Locker, was more experienced and privately doubted Albemarles capabilities. While returning to Britain, the convoy ran into heavy weather, and was forced to seek shelter in Yarmouth Roads. On 26 January one of the merchants collided with the Albemarle, an accident that nearly caused the loss of both ships. On her return Albemarle again underwent fitting between February and April 1782, this time at Portsmouth.

Next, Albemarle sailed on 7 April 1782 as escort to a convoy to Quebec. The convoy arrived on 27 May 1782, after which Nelson continued to operate off the North American coast. He narrowly escaped capture when on 14 August a French squadron under Louis-Philippe de Vaudreuil chased him off Boston.

Nelson did however capture a number of prizes during his cruise, including the French storeship Reine de France. Nelson then requested and received a transfer to the squadron under Admiral Samuel Hood, with whom he sailed to Jamaica. Notable amongst Nelson's services in the West Indies in this period was his unsuccessful attack on the French garrison at Turk's Island on 7 and 8 March 1783.

Sale
Nelson was HMS Albemarles third and last commander. She was paid off on 3 July 1783 and subsequently sold at Portsmouth for the sum of £370 on 1 June 1784.

Merchant vessel
Albemarle then disappears from readily accessible records for some years. In 1791 she reappears in the supplemental pages to Lloyd's Register. Albemarle, French-built, of 530 tons, appears with Js. Boulton, master, Calvert & Co., owner, and trade, London-Botany Bay. Calvert & Co. then chartered her to the British East India Company (EIC), who in turn chartered her to the British government to transport convicts to Australia.

Under the command of George Bowen, master, she departed Portsmouth on 27 March 1791 as part of the third fleet. By 9 April Albemarle had separated from the other vessels of the Portsmouth group. Some convicts then attempted to capture her, but the guards and the ship's company quickly suppressed the uprising. Captain Bowen hanged the two convicts that appeared to be the ringleaders. The remaining recaptured convicts revealed that two sailors had instigated the uprising and Bowen had the two restrained until he could land them at Madeira where a British warship collected them and took them back to England.

On 13 October 1791 Albemarle arrived in Port Jackson, New South Wales. She had embarked 282 male convicts, 32 of whom died during the voyage; two of these were the men executed for the mutiny. An additional six female convicts, of uncertain origin, were found on board upon arrival.

It had also provided them with money with which to purchase cargoes on behalf of the company for carriage back to England.

Fate
Albemarle left Bombay on 23 December 1792, again in company with Active. The French privateer Duguay-Trouin captured Albemarle in May 1793 and took her into Morlaix, France. A contemporary report in Lloyd's List reports Albemarle as having come from Bombay, and her captor taking her into France. The same issue has a separate report of a privateer having taken Active and having sent her into Brest. A report from three weeks later has Albemarle being taken into Morlaix.

Notes, citations, and references

Notes

Citations

References

External links
 Albemarle

Ships built in France
Frigates of the Royal Navy
Ships of the Fishery Protection Squadron of the United Kingdom
Captured ships
Ships of the British East India Company
1770s ships
Ships of the Third Fleet
Mutinies